Harald Robert Severin Klem (21 June 1884 – 24 July 1954) was a Danish gymnast and swimmer who competed in the 1906 Intercalated Games and in the 1908 Summer Olympics.

At the 1906 Intercalated Games in Athens, he was a member of the Danish gymnastics team, which won the silver medal in the team, Swedish system event.

Two years later he was part of the Danish team, which finished fourth in the team competition. He also finished fifth in his heat of 100 metre freestyle, third in his heat of 200 metre breaststroke and with a Danish 4x200 metre freestyle relay team second in his heat and did not advance in all occasions.

References

External links
 
 

1884 births
1954 deaths
Danish male artistic gymnasts
Danish male freestyle swimmers
Danish male breaststroke swimmers
Gymnasts at the 1906 Intercalated Games
Gymnasts at the 1908 Summer Olympics
Olympic gymnasts of Denmark
Olympic swimmers of Denmark
Olympic silver medalists for Denmark
Medalists at the 1906 Intercalated Games